The year 634 BC was a year of the pre-Julian Roman calendar. In the Roman Empire, it was known as year 120 Ab urbe condita . The denomination 634 BC for this year has been used since the early medieval period, when the Anno Domini calendar era became the prevalent method in Europe for naming years.

Events

Births
 Nebuchadnezzar II, king of the Neo-Babylonian Empire (approximate date)
 Jehoiakim, king of Judah (approximate date)

Deaths

References